Skanke is a Norwegian surname, and a former noble family.

Connection with the Isle of Man
According to the Skanke Family Association in Norway (Skanke-foreningen i Norge), the family can trace its roots to Jemtland in the 14th century with a high degree of certainty, and with less certainty to the Isle of Man before that. The association's shield depicts a blue-armored leg (or shank), spurred in gold, on a field of white.

The family's use of a leg motif in its heraldry has been compared with the Manx triskelion.  Manx historian George Vaughan Chichester Young, O.B.E., supposed from that similarity that the family descends from the rulers of Manx  (who lost their kingdom as a result of the Treaty of Perth and the 1275 loss of the Battle of Ronaldsway). He wrote in his work A Brief History of the Isle of Man:

Skankes opposing each other
The Kalmar Union was an unstable creation, often shook by struggles between the pro-Danish and pro-Swedish factions. These conditions would lead the family into battle, with relatives ending up on opposing sides in a war of succession.

In 1452, knight Örjan Karlson Skanke from Jemtland is mentioned as agent of Charles VIII of Sweden. Ørjan was sent to conquer Trondheim, the ancient centre of Norway's kings. Control of this vital city would have greatly strengthened Charles' claim to the throne. The answer from the Danish side came with knight Ørjan's own distant relatives.  Olav Nilsson (ca. 1400–1455) was commander of Bergenhus Fortress in Bergen. Olav Nilsson and his brother Peder, marching up from the south and pushing Ørjan out of Trondheim. The same thing happened all over again in 1453 with Ørjan seizing Trondheim and Olav and Peder driving him out once more. This second battle finally concluded the conflict over succession and ended the battles between knights of the Skanke family.

The pro-Danish side, led by the knight Olav Nilsson and his brother and fellow knight, Peder Nilsson, came out on top in this struggle. The two brothers belonged to Norwegian pro-Danish forces which repeatedly defeated the Swedish forces of Charles VIII in the area around Trondheim. After their participation in the fighting the brothers received high ranking positions in the administration of Norway.

Olav Nilsson Skanke warred with the Hanseatic League

Only a few years after becoming the main royal official in Bergen, Olav lost his position due a conflict with the Hanseatic League. The League pressured the Danish king into firing Olav after he had made attempts at reducing their autonomous status in the city. In response to this, Olav carried out a prolonged private war of piracy and raiding against both the League and Sweden, in the end forcing the Danish king into restoring his former position. After returning to Bergen, however, Olav was murdered by the League's men, together with his young son and his brother Peder, as well as the bishop of Bergen and many monks in Munkeliv Abbey which was burned. After these murders the family, led by Olav's widow Elise Eskildsdatter (d. ca. 1492) and her children, continued to fiercely battle the League through piracy until receiving compensation and restoration of status some years later.

Modern era
The Skanke Family Association in Norway is open to any person holding the Skanke or related surnames. It encourages genealogical and prosopographical research into the family.

References

Other sources
de Robelin, Roger  (1995) Skanke ätten, 
Engdal, Odd G. (2006)  Norsk marinehistorisk atlas 900–2005  (Bergen: Vigmostad & Bjørk)  
Hetland, Ingebrigt (2008)  Pirater og sjørøvere i norske farvann (Oslo: Pantagruel Forlag)   
Øye, Ingvild (1994) Bergen and the German Hansa (Bergen: Bryggens Museum)  
 Young, G.V.C. (1997) A Brief History of the Isle of Man (Mansk-Svenska Publishing Co Ltd) 
 Young, G.V.C. (1981) History of the Isle of Man Under the Norse: Or, Now Through a Glass Darkly  (Mansk-Svenska Publishing Co Ltd) 
Young, G.V.C. (1981) The three legs go to Scandinavia a monograph on the Manx royal family and their Scandinavian descendants (Mansk-Svenska Pub. Co. Ltd)

External links
Skanke-foreningen i Norge website 

Norwegian families
Norwegian noble families